Jan Jałocha (born 18 July 1957) is a Polish former football player. He was perhaps the best right-back of the eighties in Poland.

He played mostly for Wisła Kraków. He played for that club, from 1974 to 1986, 215 first league matches and scored 19 goals.

He played for the Polish national team (28 matches/1 goal) and was a participant at the 1982 FIFA World Cup, where Poland won the bronze medal. He was injured in the match with Peru and was replaced in the first squad by Marek Dziuba.

He is the uncle of Marcin Jałocha.

References 

1957 births
Living people
Polish footballers
Poland international footballers
1982 FIFA World Cup players
Wisła Kraków players
FC Augsburg players
2. Bundesliga players
Expatriate footballers in West Germany
Expatriate footballers in Germany
People from Wieliczka County
Sportspeople from Lesser Poland Voivodeship
Association football defenders
Polish expatriate sportspeople in Germany
Polish expatriate sportspeople in West Germany